Resurrection is a demo album by American death metal band Possessed. The album contains a rehearsal from 1984 and a song by Jeff Becerra's new band, Side Effect. There were only 500 copies of the album available that were recorded on 10" vinyl.

Track listing 

Possessed (band) albums
2003 albums